Carl Fredrik (von) Gertten (born 3 April 1956 in Malmö) is a Swedish filmmaker, producer and journalist. In 2017, he was appointed as an honorary doctor at Malmö University. He is a brother to the documentary filmmaker Magnus Gertten. In 1994, he founded WG Film, a production company based in Malmö. Nowadays, he combines filmmaking with his role as a creative producer. His films have reached an audience in more than 100 countries. In 2015, Aktuell Hållbarhet named Gertten as the 45 most environmentally influential person in Sweden.

Career in film

As of recent years, Gertten has directed his focus towards global matters and injustices. With the documentary film Bikes vs Cars (2015), he examines the emergence of mass motoring and the current struggle between cyclists and motorists in different metropolises across the world. The film was premiered at South by Southwest (SXSW) and quickly gained international attention. Today, the film has been shown in more than 70 countries, with more than 2000 showings.
In 2016, Gertten was awarded ”Talents du Vélo”, a cycling award for people who promote cycling as a means of transport.
Currently, Gertten is working on a production an environmental film, exposing the consequences of gold production in South Africa. The film is being produced in co-production with two South African filmmakers. Between 1986 and 1994, Gertten worked as a foreign reporter in South Africa.
Gertten worked as a journalist for newspapers, radio and television in Africa, Latin America, Asia and Europe during the 1980s and 1990s. In 1995 he published the travel book Ung man söker världen (Young man looking for the World) through the publisher Gong Gong förlag. He worked as a columnist for the newspaper Arbetet in the 1990s and for Kvällsposten in 2001–2003. He has also worked as a producer of documentaries and entertainment shows for the Swedish television channels SVT, TV 4 and TV 3.

Legal battle with Bananas
Fredrik Gertten's film Bananas!* (2009) exposed the battle of Nicaraguan fruit workers against the international corporation Dole. Following the release of the film, the banana giant opted to sue Gertten, his company and the film's producer Margarete Jangård. The film gained wide support from the Riksdag and the case was withdrawn within two months. The battle accompanying the film along with the freedom of speech led Gertten to several awards, including Anna Politkovskaya Freedom of Speech Award. The film was also awarded the Fuf-award, a yearly prize for especially meaningful efforts in international development and assistance work by the Swedish Association for Development.
Following the legal case, Max, a Swedish fast-food chain, discontinued serving Dole's fruit salad at its restaurants. In addition, the sales of FairTrade bananas in Sweden increased from 5 percent market share to 10.

Big Boys Gone Bananas!* (2011), a film examining the legal process behind Bananas!*, was premiered at Sundance Film Festival and has also been shown at Toronto, IDFA and Berlinale film festivals, reaching an audience in more than 80 countries.

Films about Malmö
During the earlier years of WG Film, Gertten used Malmö as a baseline. He has both documented and critically examined the city's social transformations since the 1980s. Often co-produced, his documentaries about Malmö have addressed Malmö FF and Zlatan Ibrahimovic, in their successes and adversities (True Blue, 1998; True Blue 2; 2001; The Way Back, 2002; Becoming Zlatan, 2016).

Other Gertten's films based in Malmö address the construction of the Öresund Bridge (Walking on Water, 2000), termination of the newspaper Arbetet (The Death of a Working Man's Newspaper, 2001), demolition of the Kockums Crane (Bye Bye Malmö, 2003) and the story of the Turning Torso (The Socialist, the Architect, and the Twisted Tower, 2005).

Dr Pei-Sze Chow's doctoral thesis researching the history of Öresund describes three of Gertten's films (Walking on Water, 2000; Bye Bye Malmö, 2003; The Socialist, the Architect, and the Twisted Tower, 2005) as a documentation of human relations surrounding the construction of various landmarks in the beginning of the 2000s. According to Chow, Gertten's films can be viewed as an unplanned trilogy of cinematic portraits which link socio-politic changes and architectural transformation.

Filmography

As director and producer
1998 – True Blue (Blådårar)
2000 – The Great Bridge (short film)
2000 – Walking on Water (Gå på vatten)
2001 – Travel with Siloutte (Resa med Siluett)
2001 – The death of a Working Man's Newspaper (Mordet på en tidning)
2002 – The Poetry General (Poesigeneralen)
2002 – The Way Back – True Blue 2 (Vägen tillbaka – Blådårar 2)
2003 – Bye Bye Malmö
2005 – An Ordinary Family
2005 – The Socialist, the Architect, and the Twisted Tower (Sossen, arkitekten och det skruvade huset)
2009 – Bananas!*
2011 – Big Boys Gone Bananas!*
2012 – The Invisible Bicycle Helmet (short documentary)
2015 – Bikes vs Cars
2016 – Becoming Zlatan (Den unge Zlatan)
2019 – Push
2019 – Jozi Gold

As producer
1998 – Sambafotboll, Lars Westman & Fredrik Ekelund
2000 – 30 years have passed, comrade, Lars Westman
2002 – Boogie Woogie Pappa, kortfilm, Erik Bäfving
2003 – Love Boat, kortfilm, Anna Norberg
2006 – Belfast Girls, Malin Andersson
2006 – Thin Ice (Tunn Is), (2006) Håkan Berthas
2006 – Milkbar, Terese Mörnvik & Ewa Einhorn
2007 – The Leftovers, Kerstin Übelacker & Michael Cavanagh
2008 – Final Image, Andrés Habbeger
2008 – Burma VJ, Anders Østergaard
2010 – I Bought A Rainforest, Jacob Andrén & Helena Nygren
2011 – Love Always, Carolyn, Maria Ramström & Malin Korkeasalo
2013 – Maria and her Shadow, Fredric Ollerstam
2017 – Dead Donkeys Fear No Hyenas, Joakim Demmer

References

External links

WG film

20th-century Swedish journalists
Swedish film directors
People from Malmö
1956 births
Living people